Euphorbia vajravelui is a species of plant in the family Euphorbiaceae. It is endemic to Tamil Nadu in India.

References

vajravelui
Flora of Tamil Nadu
Vulnerable plants
Taxonomy articles created by Polbot